JonnyX and the Groadies is a Portland, Oregon Cybergrind band. Members consist of JonnyX (vocals/beatbox), Travis West (guitar, drum machine programming, lyrics), "invisibletouch" (8-string bass) and Professor Romagna. JonnyX and the Groadies' music usually contains high tempo drum beats, heavily distorted guitar at high tempo, and bass playing medium-tempo semi-melodic riffs.

Live Concerts

Their live shows incorporate black lights, strobe lights, lasers, and fog machines.

Members

Current members
 JonnyX (Jonathan Chard) - Guitar (1996-2000), Vocals (1996–present)
 Travis West - Vocals (1996-2000), Guitar, Guitar Synth, Programming (1996–present)
 invisibletouch (Nathan Backous) - Bass guitar, Synthesizer (1997–present)
 Professor Romagna (Jeremy Romagna) - Master control (1999–present)

Former members
 David Fuccillo- Drums (1996–1997)
 Greg Chapel - Bass guitar (1996–1997)
 Kevin Millard - Guitar (1996–1997)
 Scott Noben - Drums (1997–1999)
 Kristopher Whitley - Guitar (1997-1998)
 Dyanne Sekeres - Drums, Synthesizer 1996

Discography

References

External links
JonnyX and the Groadies official website
JonnyX and the Groadies official Uvumi profile

Musical groups from Portland, Oregon
1996 establishments in Oregon
Musical groups established in 1996